Bogia is a genus of sea snails, marine gastropod mollusks in the family Lepetellidae.

Species
Species within the genus Bogia include:

 Bogia labronica (Bogi, 1984)

References

Lepetellidae
Monotypic gastropod genera